Charles Elbert McLean (born 12 August 1959) is a football coach from Cayman Islands. He was appointed as head coach of the Cayman Islands national team in September 2018. He departed the position in December 2018.

References

Living people
1959 births
Caymanian football managers